Siccia pallens is a moth in the family Erebidae. It was described by George Hampson in 1918. It is found in Uganda.

References

Endemic fauna of Uganda
Moths described in 1918
Nudariina